Club Deportivo Espartano  is a Salvadoran professional football club based in San Julián, Sonsonate, El Salvador.

The club currently plays in the Tercera Division de Fútbol Salvadoreño. 

Espartano